Hans-Joachim Zenk (born 3 June 1952) is a German sprinter. He competed in the men's 200 metres at the 1972 Summer Olympics representing East Germany.

References

1952 births
Living people
Athletes (track and field) at the 1972 Summer Olympics
German male sprinters
Olympic athletes of East Germany
Place of birth missing (living people)